Sideridis implexa is a species of moth of the family Noctuidae. It is found from Morocco to Libya, in Spain and from south-eastern Europe and the Balkans to Turkey, Israel, Lebanon and the Caucasian region.

Adults are on wing from March to April. There is one generation per year.

The larvae feed on Dianthus species.

External links
 Hadeninae of Israel

Hadeninae
Moths described in 1813
Moths of Europe
Moths of the Middle East
Taxa named by Jacob Hübner